The 2018 Swedish Athletics Championships was the 123rd national outdoor track and field championships for Sweden. It was held on 24 to 26 August at the Ekängens Friidrottsarena in Eskilstuna. It was organised by Råby-Rekarne FIF, Ärla IF and Eskilstuna FI,

Championships
Swedish outdoor championships took place at several venues beyond the main track and field championships.

Results

Men

Women

References

 Swedish Championships 2018. smfriidrott. Retrieved 2019-08-05.
 Swedish Championships Results. Friidrott.se. Retrieved 2019-08-05.

External links
 Swedish Athletics Federation website

Swedish Athletics Championships
Swedish Athletics Championships
Swedish Athletics Championships
Swedish Athletics Championships
Sports competitions in Eskilstuna